Eudejeania is a genus of parasitic flies in the family Tachinidae. There are more than 20 described species in Eudejeania.

Species
These 22 species belong to the genus Eudejeania:

 Eudejeania albipila Curran, 1941
 Eudejeania aldrichi Sabrosky, 1947
 Eudejeania andeana Sabrosky, 1947
 Eudejeania argyropa (Schiner, 1868)
 Eudejeania atrata (Guerin-Meneville, 1844)
 Eudejeania birabeni (Blanchard, 1941)
 Eudejeania browni Curran, 1941
 Eudejeania canescens Macquart, 1846
 Eudejeania femoralis Curran, 1941
 Eudejeania huascarayana Townsend, 1914
 Eudejeania melanax (Walker, 1849)
 Eudejeania mexicana (Robineau-Desvoidy, 1863)
 Eudejeania nigra Townsend, 1912
 Eudejeania nuditibia Sabrosky, 1947
 Eudejeania pachecoi Curran, 1941
 Eudejeania pallida (Robineau-Desvoidy, 1863)
 Eudejeania pallipes (Macquart, 1843)
 Eudejeania pilosa Curran, 1941
 Eudejeania pseudopyrrhopoda (Blanchard, 1941)
 Eudejeania punensis Townsend, 1913
 Eudejeania pyrrhopoda Engel, 1920
 Eudejeania subalpina Townsend, 1912

References

Further reading

 
 
 
 

Tachinidae
Articles created by Qbugbot